The Bogotá savanna is a montane savanna, located in the southwestern part of the Altiplano Cundiboyacense in the center of Colombia. The savanna is situated in the Eastern Ranges of the Colombian Andes.

Other rivers, such as the Subachoque, Bojacá, Fucha, Soacha and Tunjuelo Rivers, tributaries of the Bogotá River, form smaller valleys with very fertile soils dedicated to agriculture and cattle-breeding.

Before the Spanish conquest of the Bogotá savanna, the area was inhabited by the indigenous Muisca, who formed a loose confederation of various caciques, named the Muisca Confederation. The Bogotá savanna, known as Muyquytá, was ruled by the zipa. The people specialised in agriculture, the mining of emeralds, trade and especially the extraction of rock salt from rocks in Zipaquirá, Nemocón, Tausa and other areas on the Bogotá savanna. The salt extraction, a task exclusively of the Muisca women, gave the Muisca the name "The Salt People".

In April 1536, a group of around 800 conquistadors left the relative safety of the Caribbean coastal city of Santa Marta to start a strenuous expedition up the Magdalena River, the main fluvial artery of Colombia. Word got around among the Spanish colonisers that deep in the unknown Andes, a rich area with an advanced civilisation must exist. These tales bore the -not so much- legend of El Dorado; the city or man of gold.

After a journey of almost a year, where the Spanish lost over 80% of their soldiers, the conquistadors following the Suárez River, reached the Bogotá savanna in March 1537. The zipa who ruled the Bogotá savanna at the arrival of the Spanish was Tisquesusa. The Muisca posed little resistance to the Spanish strangers and Tisquesusa was defeated in April 1537 in Funza, in the centre of the savanna. He fled towards the western hills and died of his wounds in Facatativá, on the southwestern edge of the Bogotá savanna. The Spanish conquistador Gonzalo Jiménez de Quesada established the New Kingdom of Granada with capital Santa Fe de Bogotá on August 6, 1538. This started a process of colonisation, evangelisation and submittance of the Muisca to the new rule. Between 65 and 80% of the indigenous people perished due to European diseases as smallpox and typhus. The Spanish introduced new crops, replacing many of the New World crops that the Muisca cultivated.

Over the course of the 16th to early 20th century, the Bogotá savanna was sparsely populated and industrialised. The rise in population during the twentieth century and the expansion of agriculture and urbanisation reduced the biodiversity and natural habitat of the Bogotá savanna severely. Today, the Metropolitan Area of Bogotá on the Bogotá savanna hosts more than ten million people. Bogotá is the biggest city worldwide at altitudes above . The many rivers on the savanna are highly contaminated and efforts to solve the environmental problems are conducted in the 21st century.

Etymology 
Bogotá savanna is named after Bogotá, which is derived from Muysccubun Bacatá, which means "(Enclosure) outside of the farm fields".

Geography 

The Bogotá savanna is the southwestern part of the larger Andean plateau, the Altiplano Cundiboyacense. The savanna is a montane savanna, bordered to the east by the Eastern Hills, the Sumapaz mountains in the south, the hills of Tausa and Suesca in the north and western hills of Cundinamarca in the west.

Climate 
The dry and rainy seasons alternate frequently during the year. The driest months are December, January, February and March. June, July and August are the months that present the largest variations of temperature, and during the morning frost in the higher terrains surrounding the savanna is possible. Sometimes also ground frost is present, which has a negative impact on agriculture. Hail is a relatively common phenomenon on the savanna.

Hydrology

Rivers 
 Bogotá River - 
 Bojacá River
 Fucha River
 Teusacá River
 Juan Amarillo River
 Tunjuelo River
 Soacha River 
 Neusa River
 Río Frío
 Subachoque River

Lakes

Natural 
 Lake Guatavita - overlooking the northeastern part of the savanna
 Lake Herrera

Artificial 
 Tominé Reservoir - northeast, biggest waterbody on the Bogotá savanna - 
 Neusa Reservoir - north - 
 El Muña Reservoir - south - 
 Lake Herrera (since 1973)

Waterfalls 
 Tequendama Falls - southwestern limit

Wetlands 

There is a system of wetlands (humedales) that regulate the soil moisture acting like sponges for the rain waters. Fifteen wetlands have a protected status, with various wetlands as unprotected.

Biodiversity 

Despite the continuous urbanisation and industrial activities, the Bogotá savanna is a rich biodiverse area with many bird species registered. The diversity of mammals, amphibians and reptiles is much lower. Before the arrival of the European colonisers, the savanna was populated predominantly by white-tailed deer, the main ingredient of the Muisca cuisine. Today, this species of deer, as well as the once common spectacled bear, is restricted to protected areas surrounding the Bogotá savanna. The Thomas van der Hammen Natural Reserve is a protected area in the north of Bogotá.

History 

The earliest confirmed inhabitation of present-day Colombia was on the Bogotá savanna with sites El Abra, Tequendama and Tibitó, where semi-nomadic hunter-gatherers lived in caves and rock shelters. One of the first evidences of settlement in open area space was Aguazuque, whose oldest dated remains are analysed to be 5000 years old. This prehistorical preceramic period was followed by the Herrera Period, commonly defined from 800 BCE to 800 AD.

Muisca Confederation 

At the arrival of the Spanish conquistadors, the region was inhabited by the Muisca who lived in hundreds of small villages scattered across the plateau. These villages were individually ruled by caciques who at the same time paid tribute to the zipa, ruler of Bacatá. The Muisca were known as "The Salt People", thanks to their extraction of rock salt from brines in large pots heated over fires. This process was the exclusive task of the Muisca women.

The economy of the Muisca, meaning "person" or "people" in their indigenous version of Chibcha; Muysccubun, was self-sufficient due to the advanced agriculture on the fertile soils of the frequently flooding Bogotá savanna. More tropical and subtropical agricultural products as avocadoes and cotton were traded with their neighbours, in particular the Guane and Lache in the north and northeast and the Guayupe, Achagua and Tegua in the east.

The Muisca were known as skilled goldworkers, represented in the famous Muisca raft, that symbolises the initiation ritual of the new zipa in Lake Guatavita. This ritual, where the zipa covered himself in gold dust and jumped in the  altitude lake, gave rise to the -not so much- legend of El Dorado.

Spanish conquest 

In April 1536, a group of around 800 conquistadors left the relative safety of the Caribbean coastal city of Santa Marta to start a strenuous expedition up the Magdalena River, the main fluvial artery of Colombia. Word got around among the Spanish colonisers that deep in the unknown Andes, a rich area with an advanced civilisation must exist. These tales bore the -not so much- legend of El Dorado; the city or man of gold.

After a journey of almost a year, where the Spanish lost over 80% of their soldiers, the conquistadors following the Suárez River, reached the Bogotá savanna in March 1537. The zipa who ruled the Bogotá savanna at the arrival of the Spanish was Tisquesusa. The Muisca posed little resistance to the Spanish strangers and Tisquesusa was defeated in April 1537 in Funza, in the centre of the savanna. He fled towards the western hills and died of his wounds in Facatativá, on the southwestern edge of the Bogotá savanna. The Spanish conquistador Gonzalo Jiménez de Quesada established the New Kingdom of Granada with capital Santa Fe de Bogotá on August 6, 1538. This started a process of colonisation, evangelisation and submittance of the Muisca to the new rule. Between 65 and 80% of the indigenous people perished due to European diseases as smallpox and typhus. The Spanish introduced new crops, replacing many of the New World crops that the Muisca cultivated.

The Spanish colonizers engaged in the construction of Spanish-style towns to replace all the indigenous villages and in the process of assimilation and religious convert of the Muisca. The majority of those villages kept their indigenous names, but some were slightly modified in time, like Suacha which became Soacha, Hyntiba becoming Fontibón and Bacatá becoming Bogotá.

Modern history 

Over the course of the 16th to early 20th century, the Bogotá savanna was sparsely populated and industrialised. The rise in population during the twentieth century and the expansion of agriculture and urbanisation reduced the biodiversity and natural habitat of the Bogotá savanna severely. Today, the Metropolitan Area of Bogotá on the Bogotá savanna hosts more than ten million people. Bogotá is the biggest city worldwide at altitudes above . The many rivers on the savanna are highly contaminated and efforts to solve the environmental problems are conducted in the 21st century.

Timeline of inhabitation

Cities 

The main cities of the Bogotá savanna, in addition to the capital city of Bogotá, are: Mosquera, Soacha, Madrid, Funza, Facatativá, Subachoque, El Rosal, Tabio, Tenjo, Cota, Chía, Cajicá, Zipaquirá, Nemocón, Sopó, Tocancipá, Gachancipá, Sesquilé, Suesca, Chocontá and Guatavita.

List of municipalities

Panoramas

See also 

 Eastern Ranges 
 Eastern Hills, Bogotá
 Ocetá Páramo
 Altiplano Cundiboyacense
 neighbouring Tenza Valley, Sumapaz Páramo
 Bogotá Savannah Railway
 Train for the vicinities of the city of Bogotá
 Thomas van der Hammen

References

Notes

Bibliography

Geology

Wetlands

Flora and fauna

History

Preceramic

Muisca

Conquest and colonial period 
 

Altiplano Cundiboyacense
Montane grasslands and shrublands
Ecoregions of Colombia
Grasslands of Colombia
Sedimentary basins of Colombia
Geography of Bogotá
Geography of Cundinamarca Department